Christian Arthur Linghorne Davis (born 11 October 1992) is an English cricketer who played for Sussex. He is a right-handed batsman and left arm fast-medium bowler. He made his one day debut for Northamptonshire against Essex, on 8 August 2010. He has since played four first-class matches for Leeds-Bradford MCCU, and played for Sussex in one day and first-class cricket. In July 2016 he scored the record individual score for Sussex 2nd XI, 258* against Glamorgan 2nd XI at Abergavenny

References

External links
 
 

1992 births
Living people
People from Milton Keynes
English cricketers
Bedfordshire cricketers
Northamptonshire cricketers
Leeds/Bradford MCCU cricketers
Sussex cricketers
People educated at Bedford School
Alumni of the University of Leeds
Cricketers from Buckinghamshire